Wushan County is a county located in Chongqing municipality.

The county seat is located at the western entrance to the Wu Gorge in the Three Gorges region. Wushan is famous for its Little Three Gorges located on the nearby Daning River.

The Wushan county seat is on the northern bank of the Yangtze River channel, which in the Gorges region was flooded after the construction of the Three Gorges Dam. The original town was abandoned and submerged under the rising waters, and the new town constructed on the hills above.

The population of the town is something in excess of 100,000, and the main economic activity in the area is coal mining, almost all from very small mines in the surrounding mountains. Tourism also plays a role, although tourist activity is not as great as it was before the flooding of the Gorges in the first decade of the 21st century. The Little Three Gorges are no longer as deep or as spectacular as they once were.

The county is served by Chongqing Wushan Airport which opened in August 2019.

Mount Wushan is located east of the county.

In the novel World War Z, Dachang village was the origin of the virus' patient zero.

Administrative divisions
Two subdistricts:
 Gaotang Subdistrict, Longmen Subdistrict

Eleven towns:
 Miaoyu, Dachang, Futian, Longxi, Shuanglong, Guanyang, Luoping, Baolong, ChongqingBaolong, Guandu, Tonggu, Wuxia

Thirteen townships:
 Hongchun Township, Liangping Township, Quchi Township, Jianping Township, Daxi Township, Jinping Township, Pinghe Township, Dangyang Township, Zhuxian Township, Sanxi Township, Peishi Township, Duping Township, Dengjia Township

Climate

See also

 Wushan Man

References

County-level divisions of Chongqing